Klopce is a dispersed settlement in the hills northeast of Dolsko in the Municipality of Dol pri Ljubljani in the eastern Upper Carniola region of Slovenia.

References

External links

Klopce on Geopedia

Populated places in the Municipality of Dol pri Ljubljani